"Turn It Up" is a song by Jamaican recording artist Sean Paul from his sixth studio album Full Frequency. It was released on 30 October 2013 as a digital download. The song peaked at number 35 on the UK Singles Chart.

Chart performance

Release history

References

Sean Paul songs
2013 songs
2013 singles
Atlantic Records singles
Songs written by Ammo (record producer)
Songs written by Sean Paul